Compsus elegans is a species of weevils in the tribe Eustylini.

References

External links 

 
 
 Compsus elegans at insectoid.info

Entiminae
Beetles described in 1938